Euconocephalus is a genus of bush cricket in the 'conehead' tribe Copiphorini.

Species
The Orthoptera Species File lists the following species, distributed through Africa, tropical Asia, Australia to the Pacific islands:

 Euconocephalus afer (Karny, 1907)
 Euconocephalus australis (Bolívar, 1884)
 Euconocephalus blandus (Serville, 1838)
 Euconocephalus brachyxiphus (Redtenbacher, 1891)
 Euconocephalus broughtoni Bailey, 1980
 Euconocephalus budaunensis Farooqi & Usmani, 2019
 Euconocephalus clarus (Walker, 1869)
 Euconocephalus coarctatus (Redtenbacher, 1891)
 Euconocephalus coniceps (Redtenbacher, 1891)
 Euconocephalus cristovallensis (Montrouzier, 1855)
 Euconocephalus erythropus (Karny, 1907)
 Euconocephalus femoralis (Walker, 1869)
 Euconocephalus formosanus (Matsumura & Shiraki, 1908)
 Euconocephalus gracilis (Redtenbacher, 1891)
 Euconocephalus incertus (Walker, 1869)
 Euconocephalus insulanus (Redtenbacher, 1891)
 Euconocephalus lineatipes (Bolívar, 1890)
 Euconocephalus longissimus Wang, Shi & Ou, 2011
 Euconocephalus mucro (Haan, 1843)
 Euconocephalus nasutus (Thunberg, 1815) - type species (as Locusta acuminata Fabricius)
 Euconocephalus pallidus (Redtenbacher, 1891)
 Euconocephalus picteti (Redtenbacher, 1891)
 Euconocephalus princeps (Karny, 1907)
 Euconocephalus pyrifer (Redtenbacher, 1891)
 Euconocephalus remotus (Walker, 1869)
 Euconocephalus rosaceus (Walker, 1869)
 Euconocephalus saussurei (Redtenbacher, 1891)
 Euconocephalus sumbaensis Willemse, 1953
 Euconocephalus thunbergii (Montrouzier, 1855)
 Euconocephalus troudeti (Le Guillou, 1841)
 Euconocephalus turpis (Walker, 1869)
 Euconocephalus ultimus (Krausze, 1904)
 Euconocephalus ustulatus (Redtenbacher, 1891)
 Euconocephalus vaginalis (Redtenbacher, 1891)
 Euconocephalus varius (Walker, 1869)
 Euconocephalus veruger (Serville, 1838)

References

External links

Conocephalinae
Tettigoniidae genera
Taxonomy articles created by Polbot
Orthoptera of Asia
Orthoptera of Africa